Incompressibility may refer to:
 a property in thermodynamics and fluid dynamics, see Compressibility or Incompressible flow
 a property of a vector field, see Solenoidal vector field
 a topological property, see Incompressible surface
 a proof method in  mathematics, see Incompressibility method
 a property of strings in computer science, see Incompressible string